This is a list of what are intended to be the notable top hotels by country, five or four star hotels, notable skyscraper landmarks or historic hotels which are covered in multiple reliable publications. It should not be a directory of every hotel in every country:

Macau

Crown Towers
East Asia Hotel
Grand Lisboa
Hotel Lisboa
Mandarin Oriental Macau
MGM Grand Macau
Sintra
The Venetian Macao
Wynn Macau

Madagascar
Hotel Carlton Madagascar (formerly Hilton Tana Antananarivo)

Madeira
Hotel Reid's Palace

Malawi
Lilongwe Hotel, Lilongwe

Malaysia

 Carcosa Seri Negara, Kuala Lumpur
 Cathay Hotel, Penang
Eastern & Oriental Hotel, Penang
The Federal Kuala Lumpur, Kuala Lumpur
 First World Hotel, Genting Highlands
 Four Points by Sheraton, Kuching
 Genting Hotel, Genting Highlands
 JW Marriott Kuala Lumpur, Kuala Lumpur
 Maxims Hotel, Genting Highlands
 Miri Marriott Resort & Spa, Miri
 Renaissance Kuala Lumpur Hotel, Kuala Lumpur
 Ritz-Carlton Kuala Lumpur, Kuala Lumpur
 Shangri-La Kuala Lumpur, Kuala Lumpur
 Tanjung Sanctuary, Langkawi

Maldives

Huvafen Fushi, North Malé Atoll
Paradise Island Resort, Malé
Traders Hotel, Malé

Malta

Marquesas Islands
Auberge Hitikau, Ua Huka

Mexico

 Agua Caliente Casino and Hotel, Tijuana
 Fairmont Acapulco Princess, Acapulco
 Golden Parnassus, Cancún
 Hotel Riviera del Pacífico, Ensenada, Baja California
 Melody Maker Cancún, Cancún
 Gran Hotel of Mexico, Mexico City
 Sheraton Maria Isabel Hotel and Towers

Moldova
Butylka

Monaco
Fairmont Monte Carlo
Hotel de Paris
Hotel Hermitage

Mongolia
 Hotel Mongolia, Ulaanbaatar
 Ulaanbaatar Hotel, Ulaanbaatar

Montenegro

 Hilton Podgorica Crna Gora, Podgorica
 Hotel Mediteran, Ulcinj
 Hotel Splendid, Bečići

Morocco

Casablanca
Hyatt Regency Casablanca
Le Royal Mansour Meridien
Sheraton Casablanca Hotel & Towers

Tangier
 Hotel Continental, Tangier

Mozambique
Grande Hotel Beira, Beira

References

M